Roseville High School can refer to:

United States
 Roseville High School (Roseville, California)
 Roseville High School (Michigan)
 Roseville Area High School (Minnesota)
 Roseville High School (Ohio)